The Laemobothriidae are a family of a larger group Amblycera of the chewing lice. Most commonly they are ectoparasites of birds. The genera are sometimes all united in Laemobothrion.

References 

Lice
Insect families